The Chikmagalur railway station serves Chikmagalur in Karnataka. It was inaugurated on 19 November 2013 by then Union Railway Minister Mallikarjun Kharge along with Siddaramaiah, Chief Minister of Karnataka and C. T. Ravi, MLA, Chikkamagalur.

Geography 

Trains 
As of May 2022, only two unreserved passenger trains operate from the station:
 07366- Chikmagalur to Shivamogga town
 16239- Chikmagalur to Yeshwantpur Junction, Bengaluru

References 

Railway stations in Chikkamagaluru district
Mysore railway division
Railway stations opened in 2013